The Dalian Metro is a rapid transit system in the city of Dalian, Liaoning, China. The metro system opened on 1 May 2003. The system currently in operation consists of 6 lines: Line 1, Line 2, Line 3, Line 5, Line 12, and Line 13.

Network

Line 1

Line 1, which opened in 2015, connects east southeast central Dalian with north Dalian. The total length is 28.34 km, with 22 underground stations.

This line will run from Phoenix Peak to the Development Zone. Stations are Phoenix Peak (interchange with the Line 3 branch), Sidalin Avenue, Wuyi Road, Sujia, Maoyingzi, Houguan, Yaojia, Nanguanling (interchange with Line 2), Zhonghua Square, Dongwei Road (interchange with Line 4), Shahekou, Xi'an Road (interchange with Line 2), Convention and Exhibition Center, Heishijiao, Xueyuan Square, Xinghai Park, Maritime University, Gaoxinyuanqu, Hekou, Huangnichuan, Longwangtan, College Town, Shuishiying (interchange with Line 4), Shibanqiao, Tieshanzhen, and the Development Zone. A branch will be constructed from Wuyi Road to Jinbo Coast. There will be one station in between (Jinzhou West). The line will be constructed in three phases. Phase 1 will run from Yaojia to the Convention and Exhibition Center, Phase 2 to Hekou and the remainder in Phase 3. After the completion of this line, there will be tram and metro services from Shahekou to Hekou. Line 1's color is green.

Line 2

Line 2, opened in 2015, connects east central Dalian with west central Dalian. The line is "C" shaped.

The line will run from Haizhiyun to  when fully completed. The line will be constructed in two phases: Phase 1 from Airport to Haizhiyun, and the remainder in Phase 2. Line 2's color is blue.

Line 3

The northern area of the city, where the Economic and Technology Development Zone is located, is not well-served by buses. The metro line beginning at the downtown commercial center (near the ) runs through five administrative districts of the city and serves as an express transport between the northern (developing) region and the downtown area. A branch line was opened in 2008 and this line connects central Dalian with Jinzhou District (金州区) with seven stations from south to north.

All stations have side platforms. Tracks in the platform area have no ballast (gravel); however, tracks outside the station are on ballast. All stations are covered by a combination of transparent corrugated sheets and a concrete roof. Line 3's color is magenta.

Line 5

Line 5 runs from Houguan to Dalian railway station and then to Hutan Xinqu. Interchange stations are Houyan (interchange with Line 3), Dalian railway station (interchange with Line 3), Qingniwaqiao (interchange with Line 2). The line opened on 17 March 2023. Line 5's color is red.

Line 12

Line 12, also known as Tram Route 202 Extension Line, was opened in 2013 and connects central Dalian with Lüshunkou District. This line begins at Lüshun New Port station and stretches east ending at Hekou station, which is the interchange station with Line 1. Line 12's color is purple.

Line 13 (Phase I)

The first phase of Line 13 runs from Jiuli to Pulandian Zhenxing Street. It opened on 28 December 2021. Line 13's color is yellow.

Future Development

Under construction

Line 4
Phase 1 of Line 4 will be 23.01 km in length with 17 stations, from Yingchengzi to Suoyuwan. It is expected to open in 2027. Proposed stations are Suoyuwan (interchange with Line 5), Dongfang Road, Jinjia Street (interchange with Line 3), Jinsanjiao, Songjiang Road (interchange with Line 1), Xibei Road, Xinda Street, Zelong Lake, Polytechnic University, Xinzhaizi (interchange with Line 2), Xinping Street, Yinxing Avenue, Zhoujiagou, Dongnanshan, Qianmu, Xingfucun, Yingchengzi.

Planned

Four lines have been finalized as of 2012. The expansion project (in accordance with Chinese standards for the design and construction of metros) will use around 70 percent local labor and materials. Trains will be equipped with ATO, and stations will use an automatic fare-collection system. When lines open, they will initially operate at 38,000 p/h/d; over time, with the addition of more trains and decreasing headway, a capacity of 43,200 p/h/d is planned. The expansion program will ease traffic in Dalian (improving travel around the city for the 12th National Games of China, which will be held in Liaoning in 2013).

According to a National Development and Reform Foundation (2009) document, the urban rail transit construction plan (2009–2016) in Dalian was approved. According to the plan, the Dalian transit project is expected to invest ¥22 billion from 2009 to 2016 to build lines 1-5.

Long-term plan
 Line 6
 Line 8
 Line 9
 Line 10
 Line 14
 Line 15
 Line 16
 Line 17
 Line 18
 Line 19
 Line 20

Tickets
The lowest fare between two stations is one yuan; the fare between more than two stations is two yuan. The full fare between Dalian Station and Golden Pebble Beach is eight yuan; between Dalian Station and Jiuli the fare is seven yuan. The Pearl Card is a discounted, monthly smart card.

Rolling stock
The trains were developed and manufactured by DLoco, Dalian Locomotive and Rolling Stock Company.

Specification
1500 volts DC voltage
Train length: 78 meters
Train width 
Train height 
Axle load: 14 tons
Capacity: 800 passengers (176 seated)
Seats: 176
Traction power for AC drive: 1,440 kilowatts (180 kW × 8)
Maximum speed: 
Full range of cars equipped with 20 seats (FG0001-0020—includes 0001-0010 as the first batch, 0011-0020 for the second batch; two groups of slightly-different vehicles)

Dalian Metro ordered 38 type B trainsets in six-car formations. 18 and 20 sets will run on the future lines 1 and 2 respectively. They will have a similar lightweight, corrosion-resistant stainless-steel body.

Naming

See also
List of metro systems
Rapid transit in China
Trams in Dalian (Tram Route 201 and 202)

References

Notes

External links
 Official Website (1) of Dalian Metro Group Co., Ltd
 Official Website (2) of Dalian Metro Group Co., Ltd
 UrbanRail.net's page on the Dalian Metro

Dalian Metro
Projects established in 1987
2003 establishments in China
Railway lines opened in 2003
1500 V DC railway electrification